Zamalek TV is a television channel of Zamalek Sporting Club that broadcasts on Nilesat in SD quality. The broadcast began experimenting on 31 December 2019, and the channel actually launched on 22 January 2020.

References

External links

Zamalek TV channel on YouTube
Zamalek SC on FIFA.com
Zamalek SC on CAF
Zamalek SC on Egyptian Football Association

Zamalek SC
Television stations in Egypt
Television channels and stations established in 2020
Football club television channels